Rick Minter (born October 4, 1954) is an American football coach, most recently the defensive coordinator for the Birmingham Iron. He was the linebackers coach for the Philadelphia Eagles of the National Football League (NFL) from February 2013 to January 2016. Minter served as head football coach at the University of Cincinnati from 1994 to 2003 and as the interim head coach for Marshall University in the 2009 Little Caesars Pizza Bowl, compiling a career college football record of 54–63–1.

Early life and education
Minter was born on October 4, 1954 in Nash, Texas, and raised in Texarkana, Texas. He graduated from Texas High School in Texarkana. He then attended Henderson State University where he earned his undergraduate degree and a master's degree. He is also a member of the Phi Sigma Epsilon.

Coaching career
Minter started his career as a graduate assistant coach at Henderson State University in 1977. In 1978, he was a graduate assistant coach at the University of Arkansas where the Razorbacks finished the season 9–2–1. In 1979, he became the defensive ends coach at Louisiana Tech. From 1980 to 1982, he was the linebackers coach at North Carolina State. In 1984, he was the linebackers coach at New Mexico State.

From 1985 to 1991, Minter was the assistant head coach and defensive coordinator at Ball State. From 1992 to 1993, he served as the defensive coordinator for the University of Notre Dame, where he led the Irish to a #2 national ranking. From 1994 to 2003, he was the head football coach at the University of Cincinnati, where he compiled a 53–63–1 record. Among Cincinnati's head coaches, Rick Minter has both the record for second most career wins and the record for most career losses. He was fired at the end of the 2003 season shortly after the school accepted an invite to Big East Conference. The Bearcats played in four bowl games during his tenure.

Head coaching record

References

External links
 Florida Tech profile

1954 births
Living people
Arkansas Razorbacks football coaches
Ball State Cardinals football coaches
Birmingham Iron coaches
Cincinnati Bearcats football coaches
Florida Tech Panthers football coaches
Georgia State Panthers football coaches
Henderson State Reddies football coaches
Indiana State Sycamores football coaches
Kentucky Wildcats football coaches
Louisiana Tech Bulldogs football coaches
Marshall Thundering Herd football coaches
Michigan Wolverines football coaches
NC State Wolfpack football coaches
New Mexico State Aggies football coaches
Notre Dame Fighting Irish football coaches
Philadelphia Eagles coaches
South Carolina Gamecocks football coaches
Southern Miss Golden Eagles football coaches
Henderson State University alumni
People from Texarkana, Texas
Coaches of American football from Texas